Isaiah 37 is the thirty-seventh chapter of the Book of Isaiah in the Hebrew Bible or the Old Testament of the Christian Bible. This book contains the prophecies attributed to the prophet Isaiah, and is one of the Books of the Prophets.

Text 
The original text was written in Hebrew language. This chapter is divided into 38 verses.

Textual witnesses

Some early manuscripts containing the text of this chapter in Hebrew are of the Masoretic Text tradition, which includes the Codex Cairensis (895), the Petersburg Codex of the Prophets (916), Aleppo Codex (10th century), Codex Leningradensis (1008).

Fragments containing parts of this chapter were found among the Dead Sea Scrolls (3rd century BC or later):
 1QIsaa: complete
 1QIsab: extant verses 7‑13
 4QIsab (4Q56): extant verses 29‑32

There is also a translation into Koine Greek known as the Septuagint, made in the last few centuries BCE. Extant ancient manuscripts of the Septuagint version include Codex Vaticanus (B; B; 4th century), Codex Sinaiticus (S; BHK: S; 4th century), Codex Alexandrinus (A; A; 5th century) and Codex Marchalianus (Q; Q; 6th century).

Parashot
The parashah sections listed here are based on the Aleppo Codex. Isaiah 37 is a part of the Narrative (Isaiah 36–39). {P}: open parashah; {S}: closed parashah.
 {S} 37:1-14 {S} 37:15-32 {S} 37:33-35 {S} 37:36-38 {S}

Isaiah Assures Deliverance

Verse 2
Then he sent Eliakim, who was over the household, Shebna the scribe, and the elders of the priests, covered with sackcloth, to Isaiah the prophet, the son of Amoz.

Verse 3
This is the message which he told them to give to Isaiah:
"Today is a day of suffering; we are being punished and are in disgrace.
We are like a woman who is ready to give birth, but is too weak to do it."
A proverbial expression reflecting powerlessness.

Verses 6–7
And Isaiah said to them, "Thus you shall say to your master, 'Thus says the Lord: "Do not be afraid of the words which you have heard, with which the servants of the king of Assyria have blasphemed Me.  Surely I will send a spirit upon him, and he shall hear a rumor and return to his own land; and I will cause him to fall by the sword in his own land."'"
The promise in verse 7 about 'the king of Assyria' is taken up in verses 36–38 containing the account of its fulfillment.

Defeat of Sennacherib's Army

Verse 36
Then the angel of the Lord went out, and killed in the camp of the Assyrians one hundred and eighty-five thousand; and when people arose early in the morning, there were the corpses—all dead.

Epilogue

Verse 38
 And it came to pass, as he was worshipping in the house of Nisroch his god, that Adrammelech and Sharezer his sons smote him with the sword; and they escaped into the land of Armenia: and Esarhaddon his son reigned in his stead.

According to Assyrian records, Sennacherib was assassinated in 681 BC, twenty years after the 701 BC invasion of Judah.
 "Adrammelech": Identified as the murderer of his father Sennacherib in an Assyrian letter to Esarhaddon (ABL 1091), where he is called Arda-Mulissi.
 "Armenia": or Ararat.

See also

 Babylonian Chronicles
 Eliakim
 Eponym dating system
 Esarhaddon
 Hezekiah
 Isaiah, son of Amoz
 Jerusalem
 Kingdom of Judah
 Lachish reliefs
 Nevi'im
 Rabshakeh
 Sennacherib
 Sennacherib's Annals
 Shebna
 Tirhakah, king of Ethiopia
 Zion

Related Bible parts: 2 Kings 18, 2 Kings 19, 2 Kings 20, 2 Chronicles 29, 2 Chronicles 30, 2 Chronicles 31, 2 Chronicles 32, Isaiah 22, Isaiah 30, Isaiah 36, Isaiah 38, Isaiah 39, 1 John 4

References

Sources

External links

Jewish
Isaiah 37 Hebrew with Parallel English

Christian
Isaiah 37 English Translation with Parallel Latin Vulgate

37